Lou Jones (born 1945) is an American photographer, living in Boston. He specializes in advertising and corporate photography.  His career ranges from photojournalism covering warfare in Central America and humanitarian causes, to sports photography documenting 13 consecutive Olympics, and to jazz portraits including Miles Davis, Milt Jackson, and Charles Mingus.

Early life and education
Jones was born and raised in Washington, D.C. in 1945. His father, Leon Jones, worked for the USPS in information services. His mother, Landonia Jones, worked for the Department of Health, Education, and Welfare. His only sibling, younger sister Leonade Jones, is a private investor and independent financial consultant in the Washington, D.C. area.

Jones graduated from Gonzaga High School and received a Bachelor of Science in Physics from Rensselaer Polytechnic Institute. After working for a summer with NASA as a rocket scientist, he attended Rensselaer pursuing a graduate degree in Physics.

Career
Jones began his photography career in 1971. His commercial clients have included IBM, Major League Baseball, Federal Express, Peugeot, Museum of Fine Arts, Paris Match, KLM, National Geographic, People Magazine, Nike, Price Waterhouse, and Aetna.

He has photographed historic events such as the fall of the Berlin Wall, the Million Man March, and twelve successive Olympic Games. In the 1980s he accompanied U.S. congressmen to Nicaragua, El Salvador, Guatemala, and Honduras on CODELs (COngressional DELegations) documenting government, military and rebel leaders.

In 1990, the Museum of Afro-American History commissioned Jones to honor women with "Sojourner's Daughters".  This project led Aetna to hire Jones to photograph their annual African American History calendars through 2011.

Jones was president of the New England chapter of the American Society of Media Photographers from 1982-1986.

On April 11, 2013, Jones was featured in the premiere episode of USA Network's The Moment.  Hosted by Kurt Warner, the show featured ordinary people seeking a second chance at their dream career. Jones was the on screen mentor to aspiring sports photographer Tracey Marcum, providing shooting tips and critiques of her photos.

Since 2013, Jones has been working with developer Millennium Partners to document the construction of their high profile developments around Boston. Jones' project, called Ironclad Construction Photography, documents not only the steel and glass rising to form the sixty-story landmark, but also the diverse tradespeople risking their lives high above downtown Boston.  Since the completion of Millennium Tower in 2016, Jones has continued to work with Millennium Partners photographing the construction of Winthrop Center Tower, a 52 story tower going up in the downtown Boston.

Galleries and collections
Jones' images have been exhibited in galleries such as the Smithsonian. & Corcoran Galleries in Washington, DC, Polaroid Gallery, San Francisco Museum of Modern Art, DeCordova Museum in Massachusetts, Cooper Hewitt Museum in New York City, Detroit Institute of Arts, and Feuerwagner in Austria. His photographs are in the collections of such institutions as the Fogg Museum (Harvard), Wellesley College, Middle Tennessee State University, and University of Texas.

He is currently working on his panAFRICAproject, photographing contemporary Africa in a documentary style. The more than decade-long project features diverse images from many tribes and nations, documenting the social, economic, and cultural dynamism of modern Africa. Collections from the project have so far been exhibited at the Boston Arts Academy, Mount Ida College and Cape Cod Museum of Art.

Awards and recognitions
In 2000 the International Photographic Council (United Nations) presented him with the Professional Photographers Leadership Award.  Jones is a Nikon "Legend Behind the Lens" and a Lowepro Champion.

In 2018 Jones was the recipient of the Massachusetts Artists Leaders Coalition Champion of Artists Award.

Jones’ photography books
Jones published his first book in 1997, Final Exposure: Portraits from Death Row. For six years he documented men and women on death rows in the United States. It was republished in the fall of 2002.  For this Jones received the Ehrmann Award from the Massachusetts Citizens against the Death Penalty. His second book, travel+PHOTOGRAPHY: off the charts, was published in 2006 and is now out of print. In collaboration with New England College Press, Jones interviewed and photographed 14 imprisoned writers for his book Exiled Voices: Portals of Discovery. Jones’ newest book, Speedlights & Speedlites: Creative Flash Photography at Lightspeed, was released in May 2009 and is in its second printing.

References

External links
 Lou Jones website
 CDIA interview with Lou Jones about Olympics
PanAFRICAproject website
Downtown Crossing Project website

Living people
American photographers
1945 births
Artists from Boston
Artists from Washington, D.C.
Rensselaer Polytechnic Institute alumni
African-American photographers
21st-century African-American people
20th-century African-American people